Music informatics is a study of music processing, in particular music representations, fourier analysis of music, music synchronization, music structure analysis and chord recognition. Other music informatics research topics include computational music modeling (symbolic, distributed, etc.), computational music analysis, optical music recognition, digital audio editors, online music search engines, music information retrieval and cognitive issues in music. Because music informatics is an emerging discipline, it is a very dynamic area of research with many diverse viewpoints, whose future is yet to be determined.

Sub-topics in Music Informatics research
 interdisciplinary relationships in music informatics
 the digital revolution in music its impact on music information services and music libraries
 knowledge of current trends in music technologies including software and hardware
 mental models in the cognition of music listening and performing
 symbolic music modeling systems and computer-aided composition
 social and economic realities of the consumption of music in Western societies
 improvisation in music, especially where it is facilitated by music technology
 music digital libraries and collections architectures
 future of music distribution, the music industry, and music libraries
 music information retrieval
 music recommendation systems
 studying and synthesizing music expression
 audio signal-to-score (singing, polyphonic, piano, etc.)
 musical analysis
 musical accompaniment systems
 score following
 optical music recognition (OMR)
 music Source Separation
 music for Computer Games
 MIDI to Symbolic Score

Music informatics in education
Music informatics, as a degree subject, offers a similar learning experience to music technology, but goes further into learning the principles behind the technology.  Informatics students will not just use existing music hardware and software, but will learn programming and artificial intelligence.

See also
 generative music
 music mining software
 New Interfaces for Musical Expression

References

Music industry
Sound production technology
Information science